Iowa Highway 471 (Iowa 471) is a state highway that is located entirely within Sac County.  It was designated in November 2015 when a  portion of U.S. Highway 71 (US 71) was rerouted over Iowa 196 and onto US 20.

Route description
Iowa 471 begins at an intersection with Iowa 175 halfway between Lake View and Odebolt.  The highway heads north and roughly parallels the Boyer River.  It goes through Early and ends at an interchange with US 20 and US 71.

History
Iowa 471 was created in 2015 when a  section of US 71 was rerouted in Sac County. In August 2015, the Iowa Department of Transportation petitioned the American Association of State Highway and Transportation Officials to move US 71 between the intersections of Iowa 196 and US 20. The relocation was approved on September 25, 2015.

Major intersections

References

External links

471
Transportation in Sac County, Iowa
U.S. Route 71